Cu4tro is a 2009 Peruvian anthology drama film directed by Frank Pérez-Garland, Sergio Barrio, Christian Buckley & Bruno Ascenzo. Based on a script written by Christian Buckley and Frank Pérez-Garland. The film presents 4 episodes where the protagonists go through the harsh experience of surviving in the absence of their loved one. It premiered on October 15, 2009, in Peruvian theaters.

Synopsis

1st episode 
Cecilia, a young woman, returns to her apartment at night, finding herself exhausted, fighting against her own space, the worn-out everyday life and the overwhelming silence. In the end, she must face her deepest fears.

2nd episode 
Alex and Chiara, two brothers who must go shopping and organize the burial of their recently deceased father. In the store they meet the Seller with whom they will engage in a fun dispute to define the modality of the burial, where feelings from the most absurd to the deepest will surface.

3rd episode 
Víctor arrives at the house of Pedro, his childhood friend, who lives with his daughter after losing his wife. Gabriela, affected by the death of her mother, finds in Víctor someone she can trust, generating a close but bizarre bond.

4th episode 
Peter has to witness the last moments of the life of Raúl, a man who suffers from multiple sclerosis. The development of the plot will reveal how it affects him, since after several years of living as a couple, Peter finds himself in a relationship with an expiration date.

Cast 
The actors participating in this film are:

 Vanessa Saba as Cecilia
 Bruno Ascenzo as Alex
 Katia Condos as Salewoman
 Natalia Parodi as Chiara
 Miguel Iza as Víctor
 Gonzalo Torres as Pedro
 Gisela Ponce de León as Gabriela
 Renzo Schuller as Peter
 Paul Vega as Raúl
 Oscar López Arias as Tony

Financing 
Cu4tro was the winner of the Extraordinary Competition for Feature Film Projects, Conacine 2008, where they received S/. 450,000 to start filming.

References

External links 

 

2009 films
2009 drama films
2009 LGBT-related films
Peruvian anthology films
Peruvian drama films
Peruvian LGBT-related films
2000s Spanish-language films
2000s Peruvian films
Films set in Peru
Films shot in Peru
Films about death
Films about brothers
Films about father–daughter relationships
Films about families

2009 directorial debut films